The Ellen Johnson Sirleaf Presidential Center for Women and Development, also known as the EJS Center, is an organization to encourage and develop women in leadership roles in Africa. Founded by the former Liberian president Ellen Johnson Sirleaf in 2018, the organization aims "to be a catalyst for change across Africa, by helping unleash its most abundant untapped power – its women".

Ophelia Weeks, ex-President of the University of Liberia, was appointed as the center's first executive director.

Amujae Initiative

The center launched its flagship program, the Amujae Initiative, at the Farmington Hotel in Margibi County on International Women's Day in March 2020. 'Amujae' means "we are going up" in Liberian dialect, and the initiative aims to prepare women for promotion to leadership positions across Africa.

In 2020, Joyce Banda of Malawi and Catherine Samba-Panza of Central African Republic helped Johnson Sirleaf with the Amaujae Initiative, 15 women were chosen as the inaugural cohort of participants to receive mentorship. They were:
  Zanetor Agyeman-Rawlings, MP, doctor and activist
  Clare Akamanzi, CEO, Cabinet minister and lawyer
  Yvonne Aki-Sawyerr, mayor of Freetown
  Hadiza Bala Usman, managing director of the Nigerian Ports Authority
  Oley Dibba-Wadda, president and CEO of the Gam Africa Institute for Leadership (GAIL)
  Kula Fofana, president of People's Foundation Africa
  Yawa Hansen-Quao, executive director and social entrepreneur
  Malado Kaba, Guinea's first female finance minister
  Cornelia Kruah-Togba, NGO founder, public servant and women's advocate
  Fadzayi Mahere, lawyer, advocate, lecturer and political leader
  Aida Alassane N'Diaye-Riddick, development expert and public servant
  Angela Nwaka, nurse, consultant, legislator and NGO director
  Jumoke Oduwole, academic, government advisor, and advocate
  Upendo Duraha Penza, MP and advocate
  Blen Sahilu, human rights lawyer and gender expert

In 2021, 15 women across 11 African countries were chosen:
  Teju Abisoye, development expert, lawyer and youth advocate 
  Farida Bedwei, tech entrepreneur and disability rights advocate
  Dagmawit Moges Bekele, Minister of Transport and Member of House of People's Representatives
  Susan Grace Duku, activist and refugee advocate
  Dr. Yakama Manty Jones, economist, lecturer, entrepreneur and philanthropist
  Isata Kabia, social entrepreneur, former MP and Minister
  Bogolo Kenewendo, economist, former Minister and gender and youth activist
  Ghada Labib, Deputy Minister and communications & IT expert
  Angèle Makombo, political advisor and party leader
  Fatoumatta Njai, Parliamentarian, Women's Leadership Advocate
  Ifeyinwa Maureen Okafor, government advisor and corporate director
  Umra Omar, humanitarian, community development strategist and gubernatorial candidate
  Dr. Adaeze Oreh, Doctor, healthcare advocate and author
  Telia Urey, businesswoman, politician and activist
  Anne Waiguru, economist and governor of Kirinyaga County.

References

External links
 

2018 establishments in Africa
Organizations established in 2018
Women's organizations based in Africa
Organizations based in Liberia